Jacinto de Jesus Ayala Benjamin (born January 13, 1987) is a Dominican swimmer. He competed at the 2008 Summer Olympics.

External links

Living people
Swimmers at the 2008 Summer Olympics
Olympic swimmers of the Dominican Republic
Dominican Republic male swimmers
1987 births